The following is a list of the best-selling albums of 2017 on the Billboard China V Chart. The chart ranks in two different categories, mainland albums and imported albums using data from Chinese video-sharing site YinYueTai (YYT).

Criteria

Chart entry criteria 
There is no time limit imposed for (domestic) albums released within mainland China. For the album still sells on the Yin Yue Shopping Mall, the album is eligible to be ranked in the weekly album chart. The classification of albums into mainland and foreign albums depend on the country/location the album was released and not the language.

Structure 
The chart cycle for real time chart is updated hourly while the weekly and yearly album charts are updated every month and year respectively.

The real time chart shows only ranking without the number of sales.

The weekly chart shows only the top50 ranking albums in the month and the number of sales for only the top5 albums.

The yearly chart shows only the top50 ranking albums in the year and its number of sales. The chart will be published at the subsequent year on 1 January.

Loop holes 
 Pre-order sales for a specific album will only be counted on the release date.

 If a single album is divided into multiple editions, the sales will be counted separately.

Top 10 albums of 2017

Annual sales percentage

Mainland (Domestic) albums

Imported albums

References

Footnote 

YinYueTai
2017 in Chinese music
China albums top 10
Chinese music industry
Billboard charts